Orage may refer to:

 Orage (film), a 1938 French-language film 
 Orage (Liszt), a piano piece by Franz Liszt
 French destroyer Orage, A French naval destroyer that was sunk in the Battle of Boulogne 1940
 French landing platform dock Orage (L9022), a French naval landing ship (Ouragan-class landing platform dock) that served from 1968-2007
 Orage, a calendar application in the desktop environment Xfce

People with the surname
 Alfred Richard Orage (1873 – 1934), British intellectual and editor of The New Age